The 2009–10 version of the Saudi Federation Cup, currently being played under the guise of Prince Fasial Cup, is the 25th edition to be played. It can be considered as a League Cup competition in Saudi Arabian footballing terms.

The rules have changed from previous editions, going from an under-23 tournament to a non-age-restricted competition.

Round one groups 

Six groups containing between 4 and 6 clubs:

Saudi Federation Cup seasons
2009–10 in Saudi Arabian football